Alexander Donaldson may refer to:

 Alex Donaldson (1890–?), Scottish footballer
 Alex Donaldson (footballer, born 1893), Scottish footballer
 Alexander Donaldson (bookseller) (c. 1727–1794), publisher of the Edinburgh Advertiser newspaper

See also
 Stuart Alexander Donaldson (1854–1915), first Premier of the Colony of New South Wales